The proposed Dalli Rajhara–Jagdalpur rail line, on paper for almost three decades, once completed, would connect Dalli Rajhara to Jagdalpur, both towns being in Chhattisgarh state in India. It would also connect Raipur, the capital city of Chhattisgarh, to Jagdalpur by rail via Durg. Jagdalpur, which is about 300 km from Raipur, is currently meaningfully connected to it only by road. There is though a roundabout rail route to reach Raipur from Jagdalpur via Koraput and Rayagada in Orissa; it is much longer (622 km compared to 300 km by road) and takes much longer time (about 16 hours as compared to 5–6 hr by road) to be of any utility. In view of this, almost all the transport, in relation to both people and goods, between Raipur and Jagdalpur, happens only by road.

There have been a series of efforts in the past three decades to have meaningful rail connectivity between Jagdalpur and Raipur, but none have succeeded so far. It would be evident from a cursory glance at the railway map of India that east central India, i.e., Jagdalpur and its surrounding areas, has only one railway line i.e. the Kothavalasa–Kirandul line but not any meaningful passenger connectivity through railways and certainly no usable rail connectivity with Raipur.

Project rationale
The proposed Dalli Rajhara–Jagdalpur rail line has several objectives: to haul iron ore from the proposed Rowghat mines needed for Bhilai Steel Plant of Steel Authority of India Limited (SAIL) located in Bhilai city of Chhattisgarh state, provide efficient and economical means of transporting iron ore mined from NMDC's Bailadilla mines in Chhattisgarh, supporting the NMDC's upcoming Nagarnar Steel Plant near Jagdalpur for inward and outward traffic and finally to cater to the passenger and goods transport needs of those residing along and in the influence zone of the rail line till Jagdalpur, another city in Chhattisgarh state.

At present, Bhilai Steel Plant is getting iron ore from Dalli Rajhara where the reserve is reported to be fast depleting. The remaining reserve is estimated to last for not more than a few years. Further, Bhilai Steel Plant is in the process of expanding its crude steel capacity to 7 Mn tonnes per annum from the current 3.925 Mn tonnes per annum.

SAIL has engaged a Mines Developer and Operator (MDO) M/s ACB Mining Private Limited (Delhi) in September 2017 for development and operation of Rowghat mines on its behalf. ACB Mining, the MDO, shall develop Rowghat iron ore mines on behalf of SAIL/Bhilai Steel Plant for a period of 30 years and commercial production from mines shall begin from the year 2022.

The Rowghat mining project, therefore, is expected to substitute Dalli Rajhara mines as well as support the ongoing plant expansion project in so far as supply of iron ore to the plant is concerned.

In view of this, the proposed rail line has become critical for supporting the iron ore needs of Bhilai Steel Plant, NDMC's iron ore supply in Chhattisgarh and to support the Nagarnar Steel Plant.

History
The development of this rail line earlier was integral to and was linked to the development of the Rowghat Mines. Hence issues and hurdles affecting the Rowghat Mines have been directly impacting the fate of this rail line as well. More recently, other factors such as Nagarnar Steel Plant and  NMDC's iron ore supply to Raipur and other parts of Chhattisgarh have also acted as catalysts for the project.

SAIL made its first application in 1983 for Rowghat mines and after 13 years in 1996, the Ministry of Environment and Forests (MoEF) granted in principle environmental clearance.

A Memorandum of Understanding (MoU) among Railway, Madhya Pradesh State Government (from which Chhattisgarh state was later formed on 1 November 2000), National Mineral Development Corporation (NMDC) and Steel Authority of India Limited (SAIL) was signed on 02.04.1998.

In 2004 the MoEF asked SAIL to submit fresh application for forestry and environment clearance. SAIL, after conducting studies by IBM, Central Mines and Research Institute, Zoological Survey of India, National Environmental Engineering Research Institute and others, submitted the application in 2006. After the government of Chhattisgarh forwarded SAIL's proposal for forestry clearance in May 2007 to the MoEF, the ministry referred it to the empowered committee of the Supreme Court in around June 2007.

A revised Memorandum of Understanding (MOU) was signed between the Ministry of Railways and Government of Chhattisgarh, SAIL, NMDC on 11.12.2007 to implement the construction of Dalli Rajhara–Rowghat–Jagdalpur (235 km) broad gauge rail link project on cost-sharing basis.

The Supreme Court Committee gave its final consent for forestry clearance of Rowghat Mines during October 2008 for its F block. The Supreme Court ruling was forwarded to the MoEF for the final clearance.

The Mineral Resources Department of Chhattisgarh government finally in October 2009 granted mining lease for F Block of Rowghat Mines to SAIL for a period of 20 years after getting the due Environmental Clearance and Forestry Clearance from the MoEF.

Project phases
The Total Distance from Durg to Jagdalpur will become . The proposed Dalli-Rajhara railway station - Jagdalpur railway line will make distance between Jagdalpur & Raipur to  & just 6 hrs 30 mins travel time.

Stations in Phase 1
Starting from Dalli-Rajhara railway station,  from Durg, the following completed & proposed stations are:- 

 Dalli Rajhara  Existing railway station.
 Salhaitola  Completed.
 Gudum  (near Dondi) Completed.
 Bhanupratappur  Completed.
 Keoti  Completed.
 Antagarh  Completed.
 Taroki  In progress.
 Rowghat  In progress.

Stations in Phase 2
Starting from Jagdalpur, following are the proposed stations.

 Jagdalpur -   Existing railway station.
 Kudkanar -  Survey completed.
 Bastar -  Survey completed.
 Sonarpal - Survey completed.
 Bhanpuri -  Survey completed.
 Dhikonga -  Survey completed.
 Baniyagaon -  Survey completed.
 Kondagaon -  Survey completed.
 Jugani -  Survey completed.
 Chandganv -  Survey completed.
 Narayanpur -  Survey completed.
 Barnda -  Survey completed.
 Rowghat -  In progress (part of Phase 1).

Project cost and its sharing

The Phase 1 cost of Rs 1,141 crore would be entirely financed by SAIL, while Rs 2,512 crore price tag of Phase 2 will be shared between Railways, SAIL, NMDC and Chhattisgarh government.

Challenges for the project

Opposition from Naxalites

Project, after facing many years of procedural and clearance related hurdles, is currently facing stiff resistance and opposition from Naxalites.

The Rowghat iron ore mining project had been facing resistance right from inception following threats from the Naxalites. The left extremist group have a strong influence in the Rowghat mines area and their opposition delayed start of the work.

Union Home minister of Government of India, during February 2015, had assured that centre would provide all necessary assistance and would deploy adequate security personnel following Naxalites open threat. Earlier, the rebels had set equipment on fire when the authorities tried to start the work on Rowghat project.

In February 2016, two troopers of Sashastra Seema Bal (SSB) were injured after an improvised explosive device (IED) planted by Maoists went off in the project area. Notably, the passenger train from Dallirajhara to Gudma under the project was also flagged off by Railway Minister via video conferencing on the same day.

In May 2017, a Sashastra Seema Bal (SSB) jawan was injured in an IED blast triggered by Maoists.

In November 2017, one of the project contractor's son was kidnapped and later shot dead by Naxals. According to police, the Maoists have been opposing the project since its inception, fearing that the construction of the rail route will speed up the development work in Bastar thereby uprooting them from the region.

Environment clearance
The environment and forestry clearance for undertaking mining in F Block of the Rowghat Mines took SAIL nearly 26 years to obtain as detailed in History section above. This has led to delay in launch of the rail line project as well.

Security cover for project
For the purpose of security cover to railway tracks, 2 Battalions (28th & 33rd) of Sashastra Seema Bal (SSB) have been deployed in the Balod and Kanker district of Chhattisgarh since May and October 2014, respectively. The purpose of deployment is to guard and give protection for construction of Dalli Rajhara to Rowghat railway lines of 95 km. Since their deployment from May 2014 the 17-km long stretch of railway line has been laid from Dalli Rajhara to Gudum and has been successfully operationalised w.e.f 01/02/2016.

Current status

The 235-km-long railway line will be constructed in two phases. Work on the first phase of 95 km-long track from Dallirajhara to Rowghat is in progress, while for the construction of 140 km long second phase from Rowghat to Jagdalpur, survey work is currently being carried out and construction is slated to commence shortly.

At present, two of Indian Railways' subsidiaries—RVNL (Rail Vikas Nigam Ltd) and IRCON (Indian Railway Construction Organisation)—are engaged in implementing the project. The work on Phase 1 of 95 km from Dalli Rajhara to Rowghat is being executed by RVNL, while IRCON is working on Phase 2 from Rowghat to Jagdalpur.

Dalli Rajhara–Rowghat section

The 17 km line between Dalli Rajhara and Gudum under the Phase 1 has been completed and passenger trains are being operated between these two stations. Railways have recently extended the tracks to 17 kilometres up to Bhanupratappur from Gudum. A trial run was conducted by an engine on 31 December 2017. Statutory inspection of Gudum–Bhanupratapur section of the railway line was carried out on 15 March 2018 by the Indian Railways. On 14 April 2018, Prime Minister of India inaugurated the railway line between Gudum and Bhanupratapur along with flagging off a passenger train, bringing north Bastar region on India's railway map.

A trial run was conducted between Bhanupratappur and Keoti on 27 Mar 2019.

Laying of new railway tracks between Bhanupratappur and Keoti under Durg–Dallirajhara section of the Raipur division of South East Central Railway has been completed.

On 30 May 2019, the passenger trains from Raipur and Dalli Rajhara have been extended to Keoti railway station.

A trial run was conducted between Keoti and Antagarh railway station on August 2020.
As a part of the 235 km Dallirajhara-Rowghat-Jagdalpur railway project, Antagarh, which has a Nagar Panchayat, is now connected to state capital Raipur by a train service on 13th Aug 2022.

Jagdalpur–Rowghat

As a follow-up to the agreement amongst NMDC, IRCON, SAIL and CMDC signed on 20 January 2016, an SPV named Bastar Railway Private Limited (BRPL) was formed on 5 May 2016  for undertaking implementation of the railway line from Jagdalpur to Rowghat.

NDMC has the biggest shareholding in BRPL at 43 percent while SAIL, IRCON & Govt. of Chhattisgarh have shareholding of 21 percent, 26 percent and 10 percent respectively.

BRPL and IRCON have signed a project execution agreement in July 2017, under which IRCON will construct the railway line between Jagdalpur to Rawghat in Chhattisgarh. The railway line will have 13 new Railway stations and the estimated project cost of this Rail corridor is Rs 2,538 crore approximately.

Presently, Detailed Project Report (DPR) for this section of the rail line has already been sanctioned by the Railways Board.

Survey work is currently underway and the target was earlier set to complete survey work of Jagdalpur–Kondagaon–Narayanpur by the month of March 2016 and of Narayanpur–Rowghat section by the month of May 2016, but there have been delays reported. In a government review carried out in February 2018, it was reported that the survey work for Jagdalpur to Kondagaon railway track laying comprising length of 91.76 km had been completed for Jagdalpur–Rowghat Railway project. It was also reported that the survey work for Kondagaon to Rowghat for the 91.6 km to 140 km distance in under progress. The project team was directed by government to complete all the survey work for the project by March 15, 2018.

References

Rail transport in Chhattisgarh
Steel Authority of India
Proposed railway lines in India